Jasa is a municipality in Spain.

JASA may stand for:
 Japan–America Security Alliance, signed in 1951
 Journal of the Acoustical Society of America
 Journal of the American Statistical Association
 JASA Brand of disposable food packaging products in Malaysia
 Jose Abad Santos Avenue, a major road, designated as National Route 3 (N3) in the Philippines.
 Perspectives on Science and Christian Faith, subtitled "Journal of the American Scientific Affiliation"
 Special Affairs Department, a defunct government department in Malaysia.

See also 
 Jassa, a genus of crustaceans